Trump National Golf Club, Jupiter is a private golf club in Jupiter, Florida with a  course designed by Jack Nicklaus.

The Club is owned by Former President Donald J. Trump.

History

The club opened in 2002 as the Ritz-Carlton Golf Club & Spa. In December 2012, Donald Trump purchased the property from Ritz-Carlton for $5 million including assumption of $30 million in debt from refundable deposits to club members. Former members filed sue resulting in a February 2017 settlement for $5 million.

On February 11, 2017, President Trump hosted Japanese Prime Minister Shinzō Abe at the Club.

See also
 Donald Trump and golf

References

External links

Buildings and structures in Palm Beach County, Florida
Golf clubs and courses in Florida
Golf clubs and courses designed by Jack Nicklaus
Assets owned by the Trump Organization
2002 establishments in Florida